Heaven and Earth Magic (also known as Number 12, The Magic Feature, or Heaven and Earth Magic Feature) is a 1962 American avant-garde independent cutout animation film directed by visual artist, filmmaker and mystic Harry Everett Smith. Jonas Mekas gave the film its title Heaven and Earth Magic in 1964/65.

Plot
Harry Smith stated of Heaven and Earth Magic: "The first part depicts the heroine's toothache consequent to the loss of a valuable watermelon, her dentistry and transportation to heaven. Next follows an elaborate exposition of the heavenly land in terms of Israel, Montreal and the second part depicts the return to earth from being eaten by Max Müller on the day Edward the Seventh dedicated the Great Sewer of London."

Production
The film used cut-outs created from 19th century catalogues.

Music
The film is accompanied by a musique concrète score featuring the noises of water, clocks and sound effects albums. John Waters of The Independent described it as "the sort of soundtrack you could put together in a hotel room", noting that "Smith lived at the Chelsea Hotel, rent unpaid, for much of that time."

Reception and legacy
Fred Camper from Chicago Reader praised the film's artistic style, calling it "a mysterious world of alchemical transformations in which objects suggest a multitude of possibilities." Time Out Magazine offered the film similar praise, comparing it to the works of Max Ernst and Georges Méliès.

It is listed in the film reference book 1001 Movies You Must See Before You Die, noting the film as director Harry Smith's magnum opus, and saying "Incomplete, deeply idiosyncratic, rearranged from materials taken largely from an earlier period —a Victorian-era catalogue— it is explicitly "folk" in nature." Writing in 1999 for The Independent, Waters noted that "Smith's stop-frame animations look remarkably similar to Terry Gilliam's Monty Python animations made a few years later".

See also
List of animated feature films
List of stop-motion films
Cutout animation
Alchemy
Hermetic Qabalah

References

Citations

Sources

Books

Websites

External links
 
 
 

1962 animated films
1962 films
1960s American animated films
1960s avant-garde and experimental films
1960s fantasy films
Collage film
Cutout animation films
Animated films without speech
1960s stop-motion animated films
Films directed by Harry Everett Smith
Fantastic art
Hermetic Qabalah
American adult animated films
1960s English-language films
Musique concrète
1962 independent films
American independent films